Angus Alexander McLean,  (December 17, 1854 – April 3, 1943) was a Canadian lawyer and politician.

Born in Belfast, Prince Edward Island, the son of William McLean. McLean was educated at the Prince of Wales College, Charlottetown, and the Harvard Law School. A lawyer and King's Counsel, he was married to Leah Yeo, daughter of John Yeo, from 1882 to her death in 1897. His second wife was Frances H. Longworth.

He was a law clerk of the Prince Edward Legislature for eight years. In 1894, he was appointed Revising Officer for East Queen's and was an official Assignee under the Dominion Insolvency Act for five years. In 1904, he was elected President of the Prince Edward Island Law Society.

McLean was a Conservative member of the Legislative Assembly of Prince Edward Island for 4th Queens from 1888 until 1900. He ran unsuccessfully for the House of Commons of Canada in a 1902 and 1904 by-elections for West Queen's. A Conservative, he was first elected in the general elections of 1904 for Queen's and was defeated in 1908. He was re-elected in 1911 and did not run in 1917.

References
 
 The Canadian Parliament; biographical sketches and photo-engravures of the senators and members of the House of Commons of Canada. Being the tenth Parliament, elected November 3, 1904

1854 births
1943 deaths
Canadian King's Counsel
Harvard Law School alumni
People from Queens County, Prince Edward Island
Conservative Party of Canada (1867–1942) MPs
Members of the House of Commons of Canada from Prince Edward Island
Progressive Conservative Party of Prince Edward Island MLAs